Oak View is an unincorporated community in Ventura County, California, United States. The community is located along the Ventura River in a narrow valley between the towns of Casitas Springs (south) and Mira Monte (north). Lake Casitas and the community of Ojai are also nearby. At the 2010 census, the population of Oak View was 4,066, down from 4,199 at the 2000 census, making it the third largest community between Ojai and the city of Ventura. For statistical purposes, the United States Census Bureau has defined Oak View as a census-designated place (CDP). The census definition of the area may not precisely correspond to local understanding of the area with the same name.

Etymology
Oak View was given its name in 1925 due to the garden-like appearance of its many oak groves.

History

The town of Oak View was established as a 'bedroom community' during the late 1940s and early 1950s, primarily home to local oil industry workers who found work in nearby Ventura.  Besides nearby downtown Ojai, Oak View is the only other town in the Ojai Valley with a discernible "downtown", which has developed along the Ventura Avenue/Highway 33 corridor.   Oak View's 'downtown' has a number of businesses and services that have withstood the test of time and economic conditions.  Among them, you'll find a post office, a grocery store, a grocery mart, one bank, a Thai restaurant, a coffee house/restaurant, a Mexican restaurant, a pizza parlor, two automobile repair shops, two tire shops, two self-serve gasoline stations, two coffee shops, an equipment rental yard, several hair stylists, a pet supplies store, a liquor store, a walk-in medical office, a car wash, and a laundromat.

At various times over the years, some locals have considered incorporating as a city, as an alternative to County of Ventura governance.  Some considered a name change to "River City." But, until the town has the ability to provide the same services as an incorporated city, this won't happen.

A volunteer Civic Council -- Oak View Civic Council --- which is a non-partisan, non-sectarian, and non-political organization, acts as a coordinating group to work with locals and advance civic, cultural, educational, philanthropic, and social goals of the community.  Yearly Council-sponsored activities include two long-held events: the annual Christmas Tree Lighting, and the Memorial Day Parade.  Other events have included BBQ events with all locals invited, family days, pageants of excellence, Oak View History days.  The Council Website URL is http://oakviewciviccouncil.org.  The site has a local resources link: http://www.oakviewciviccouncil.org/local_resources.html.  Also, an online Oak View Community Forum exists where locals can post ideas and suggestions: http://oakviewciviccouncil.org/forum/index.php. Finally, a Website focused on Oak View can be found at https://www.oakviewca.org/

Geography
Oak View is located at  (34.397416, -119.300127).

Education
Although Oak View is located within the Ojai Valley, the town itself is located within the boundaries of the Ventura Unified School District.  There is one school in Oak View, Arnaz Elementary (aka, Sunset Elementary), which is located on the south western portion of the town, at 400 Sunset.  Previously, two schools served the town. However, Oak View Elementary School, located between Prospect Street and Valley Road, and between Mahoney Avenue and Santa Ana Boulevard (Click here to see the Google map of the former Oak View Elementary), was closed by the district.  The County considered selling the property to a housing developer who planned to build a high-density development (up to 33 houses) meant to serve low-income owners / renters.  Instead, a successful local ballot initiative was passed, which places a parcel tax on Oak View residential property owners.  The yearly tax helps to pay down the long-term purchase of the school from the County.  The former school property was renamed, "The Oak View Park and Resource Center," (http://www.ovparc.org) which maintains the property and manages non-profit and for-profit organizations serving the community.

Libraries
Public Libraries: Ventura County Library - 14 locations with three branches in the Ojai Valley: Oak View Library, Ojai Library, and Meiners Oaks Library.

Demographics

2010
At the 2010 census Oak View had a population of 4,066. The racial makeup of Oak View was 3,227 (79.4%) White, 11 (0.3%) African American, 63 (1.5%) Native American, 34 (0.8%) Asian, 3 (0.1%) Pacific Islander, 575 (14.1%) from other races, and 153 (3.8%) from two or more races. Hispanic or Latino of any race were 1,217 persons (29.9%).

The whole population lived in households, no one lived in non-institutionalized group quarters and no one was institutionalized.

There were 1,419 households, 495 (34.9%) had children under the age of 18 living in them, 790 (55.7%) were opposite-sex married couples living together, 139 (9.8%) had a female householder with no husband present, 106 (7.5%) had a male householder with no wife present.  There were 104 (7.3%) unmarried opposite-sex partnerships, and 12 (0.8%) same-sex married couples or partnerships. 262 households (18.5%) were one person and 82 (5.8%) had someone living alone who was 65 or older. The average household size was 2.87.  There were 1,035 families (72.9% of households); the average family size was 3.24.

The age distribution was 971 people (23.9%) under the age of 18, 356 people (8.8%) aged 18 to 24, 1,013 people (24.9%) aged 25 to 44, 1,310 people (32.2%) aged 45 to 64, and 416 people (10.2%) who were 65 or older.  The median age was 39.6 years. For every 100 females, there were 100.0 males.  For every 100 females age 18 and over, there were 98.8 males.

There were 1,523 housing units at an average density of 776.3 per square mile, of the occupied units 1,015 (71.5%) were owner-occupied and 404 (28.5%) were rented. The homeowner vacancy rate was 1.3%; the rental vacancy rate was 5.8%.  2,834 people (69.7% of the population) lived in owner-occupied housing units and 1,232 people (30.3%) lived in rental housing units.

2000
According to the census of 2000, there were 4,199 people, 1,430 households, and 1,069 families in the CDP. The racial makeup of the CDP was 85.57% White, 0.57% African American, 1.67% Native American, 0.90% Asian, 0.05% Pacific Islander, 8.31% from other races, and 2.93% from two or more races. Hispanic or Latino of any race were 19.50% of the population.

Of the 1,430 households 37.8% had children under the age of 18 living with them, 60.3% were married couples living together, 9.2% had a female householder with no husband present, and 25.2% were non-families. 16.6% of households were one person and 5.1% were one person aged 65 or older.  The average household size was 2.94 and the average family size was 3.31.

The age distribution was 28.0% under the age of 18, 8.4% from 18 to 24, 30.7% from 25 to 44, 24.6% from 45 to 64, and 8.3% 65 or older.  The median age was 36 years. For every 100 females, there were 98.3 males.  For every 100 females age 18 and over, there were 99.5 males.

The median household income was $56,786 and the median family income  was $61,613. Males had a median income of $48,750 versus $39,554 for females. The per capita income for the CDP was $25,534.  About 5.3% of families and 6.0% of the population were below the poverty line, including 6.1% of those under age 18 and 9.5% of those age 65 or over.

Notes

External links
 Oak View Civic Council

Census-designated places in Ventura County, California
Census-designated places in California